The 2014–15 Memphis Tigers men's basketball team represented the University of Memphis in the 2014–15 NCAA Division I men's basketball season, the 94th season of Tiger basketball. The Tigers, led by sixth year head coach Josh Pastner, played their home games at the FedExForum. The 2014–15 season was the second season the Tigers participated in the American Athletic Conference. The Tigers didn't play in a postseason tournament, the first time in 15 years.

Previous season
The 2013–14 Memphis Tigers finished the season with an overall record of 24–10 and 12–6 in AAC play to finish in a three way tie for third place in conference. They lost in the quarterfinals of the AAC tournament to eventual national champion UConn. They received an at-large bid to the NCAA tournament's East Region as an 8 seed where they defeated 9 seed George Washington in the second round before losing in the third round to 1 seed Virginia.

Off-season

Departures

Transfers

Recruiting

Season summary 

The Tigers entered the 2014-15 season with only one senior, incoming transfer Calvin Godfrey.  The young Tigers toured Canada in August 2014 and were thus permitted extra practice time.  The Tigers faced teams from the University of Ottawa, Carleton University, and McGill University on the trip in exhibition matches.  Immediately before the Canadian tour, guard/forward Damien Wilson then center Dominic Woodson successively announced that they were transferring away from Memphis.  However, upon the team's return from Canada, former Vanderbilt point guard Kedren Johnson announced his intention to transfer to Memphis.

At the AAC media day on October 29, Memphis was picked to finish third in the league behind UConn and SMU.  Shaq Goodwin and Austin Nichols were both named to the preseason all-AAC first team.

The Tigers lost their sole exhibition game against Division 2 Christian Brothers, marking the first exhibition game loss for the team since 1996.  On November 24, after the team's second game of the season, true freshman point guard Dominic Magee announced his intent to transfer.  Magee did not any playing time for the Tigers before his transfer.  The Tigers dropped 4 of their first 7 games of the year, starting the year with their worst record since 2000.

On January 6, sophomore Kuran Iverson was suspended for the team's next two games against SMU and Houston, marking Iverson's second suspension of the season. After his suspension and subsequent actions, including using Twitter to make negative statements about Coach Pastner, it was reported that Iverson was not expected to return to the team and the University subsequently announced Iverson's dismissal from the basketball program.  Junior forward Trahson Burrell was suspended for the team's January 8 game against SMU, reportedly in part for supporting Iverson's actions prior to his suspension.

On February 7 against Temple, Austin Nichols injured his ankle and had to be helped off the floor. The Tigers went on to lose the game without Nichols, who was later diagnosed with a moderately sprained ankle which was expected to prevent him from playing for the next two weeks.  However, Nichols was able to return on February 19 at home against UConn before injuring the ankle again on February 28 early in the second half against Tulsa.  The second ankle injury caused Nichols to miss the remainder of the season.  Despite his injury and subsequent absence, Nichols finished the season with 93 blocks, the 5th highest single season block total all time for a Tiger.

The Tigers finished the regular season in 5th place in the American.  Austin Nichols was named to the All-AAC first team.  In the AAC tournament, the Tigers lost their opening matchup to 4 seed Temple.

Roster

Schedule

|-
!colspan=9 style="background:#0C1C8C; color:#8E9295;"| Exhibition

|-
!colspan=9 style="background:#0C1C8C; color:#8E9295;"| Regular season

|-
!colspan=9 style="background:#0C1C8C; color:#8E9295;"| American Athletic Conference tournament

References

Memphis
Memphis Tigers men's basketball seasons
Memphis Tigers men's basketball
Memphis Tigers men's basketball